General elections were held in Saint Kitts-Nevis-Anguilla on 10 May 1971. The result was a victory for the Saint Kitts-Nevis-Anguilla Labour Party (SKNALP), which won seven of the nine elected seats. The SKNALP won all seven seats at the island of Saint Kitts, while the two seats at the island of Nevis were divided between the People's Action Movement and the Nevis Reformation Party. Anguilla, which was nominally entitled to one seat, boycotted the elections in the aftermath of the 1969 referendum. Voter turnout was 87.9%.

Results

References

Saint Kitts
Elections in Saint Kitts and Nevis
1971 in Saint Kitts-Nevis-Anguilla
Elections in Anguilla
May 1971 events in North America
Saint Kitts